Chicago City Hall is a 10-story building that houses the official seat of government of the City of Chicago in Illinois. Adjacent to the Richard J. Daley Center and the James R. Thompson Center, the building that includes Chicago City Hall houses the offices of the mayor, city clerk, and city treasurer; some city departments; aldermen of Chicago's various wards; and chambers of the Chicago City Council on the west side of the building.  The building's east side (called County Building) is devoted to the various offices of Cook County, including chambers for the Cook County Board of Commissioners.

Situated on a city block bounded by Randolph, LaSalle, Washington Boulevard, and Clark Street, the 11-story structure was designed by the architectural firm Holabird & Roche in the classical revival style and built to replace and expand an earlier city hall.    Its location has served as the center of city government from 1853 to 1871, and with a break due to the Great Chicago Fire, from 1885 to the present.  The current hall was officially dedicated on February 27, 1911.

History

The first Chicago City Hall in 1837 was in leased chambers in the Saloon Building on the corner of Lake and Clark Streets.  The city next leased space in a building owned by Nancy Chapman, from 1842 until 1848, when Old Market Hall was constructed in LaSalle Street. The city owned market hall held city council business on its second floor, with shops below until 1853.  A new combined city hall and county courthouse was then constructed in the public square made by Randolph, LaSalle, Washington, and Clark Streets (this building, which no longer exists, is sometimes referred to as, Old Chicago Courthouse).  Abraham Lincoln's body lay in state here during his funeral services in 1865.  The courthouse bell was rung in 1871 to raise the alarm during the Great Chicago Fire before the hall burned to the ground.

A hastily constructed hall nicknamed the 'old rookery' was built around a water tank that survived the fire at LaSalle and Adams streets—today, that site houses the Rookery Building (built 1888). In 1885, the city and county completed construction of a new combined building in the French Empire style at the present site (and the site of the old courthouse).  This building was demolished and replaced in 1905 by the present and larger classical revival structure.

Features

Chicago City Hall's entrance features four relief panels sculpted in granite by John Flanagan.  Each of the panels represents one of four principal concerns of city government: playgrounds, schools, parks, and water supply.  As visitors enter the building, they are greeted with elaborate marble stairways and bronze tablets honoring the past city halls of Chicago from 1837 to the present.  The first major renovation project undertaken was in 1967 as major city departments, originally located outside Chicago City Hall, were moved in.

The "fifth floor" is sometimes used as a metonym for the office and power of the mayor – located in City Hall.

Green Roof
In 2001,  roof gardens were completed serving as a pilot project to assess the impact green roofs would have on the heat island effect in urban areas, rainwater runoff, and the effectiveness of differing types of green roofs and plant species for Chicago's climate. Although the rooftop is not normally accessible to the public, it is visually accessible from 33 taller buildings in the area. The Garden consists of 20,000 plants of more than 150 species, including shrubs, vines and two trees. The green roof design team was headed by the Chicago area firm Conservation Design Forum in conjunction with noted "green" architect William McDonough. Tours of the green roof are by special arrangement only. The Chicago City Hall Green Roof won the Merit Design Award of the American Society of Landscape Architecture (ASLA) competition in 2002.

In media
The exterior and parts of the interior of Chicago City Hall were featured in the 1980 comedy film The Blues Brothers when the titular characters, Jake and Elwood Blues, race to the building to pay a tax deadline while being chased by a horde of police officers, firefighters, and the military.

The interiors of Chicago City Hall were featured in the 1993 blockbuster movie The Fugitive, where Richard Kimble (played by Harrison Ford) is chased down the stairs by U.S. Marshal Samuel Gerard (Tommy Lee Jones), until spilling into the lobby, where Kimble narrowly escapes being apprehended by Gerard and his men.

Agencies
The Following Agencies are located in City Hall:

Elected Offices:
Office of the Mayor - 5th Floor
Mayor's Office for People with Disabilities
City Council - 2nd Floor (Council Chambers)
City Clerk - 1st Floor
Treasurer - Room 106
Buildings Department - Room 900
Department of Finance - 7th Floor
Department of Law - Suite 600
Business Affairs and Consumer Protection - 8th Floor
Department of Planning and Development - 10th Floor
Department of Streets and Sanitation - Room 1107
Office of Emergency Management and Communications 
Department of Procurement Services - Room 806
Department Human Resources

References

External links

 Chicago Landmarks: City Hall-County Building
 Cook County
 ASLA Merit Award 2002: Chicago City Hall Green Roof 

City and town halls in Illinois
City Hall
Central Chicago
City Hall
Government buildings completed in 1911
City Hall
1911 establishments in Illinois
Projects by Holabird & Root
Chicago Landmarks
Government of Cook County, Illinois